Every Single Day: Complete Bonnie Pink (1995–2006) is Bonnie Pink's third greatest hits album released under the Warner Music Japan label on July 26, 2006.

Track listing

Disc One
Heaven's Kitchen (from Heaven's Kitchen)
Forget Me Not (from Evil & Flowers)
 (Non-album song)
 (Non-album song)
 (from Blue Jam)
 (Non-album song)
Surprise! (Non-album song)
Lie Lie Lie (from Heaven's Kitchen)
 (from Evil & Flowers)
It's Gonna Rain! (from Heaven's Kitchen)
Do You Crash? (from Heaven's Kitchen)
The Last Thing I Can Do (Non-album song)
Evil & Flowers (Piano Version) (from Evil & Flowers)

Disc Two
So Wonderful (from Golden Tears)
Daisy (Non-album song)
You Are Blue, So Am I (from Let Go)
 (from Let Go)
Sleeping Child (from Let Go)
Tonight, the Night (from Present)
Take Me In (from Just a Girl)
 (from Just a Girl)
Thinking of You (from Just a Girl)
New York (Non-album song)
Love is Bubble (Non-album song)
Private Laughter (from Even So)
Souldiers (Non-album song)
A Perfect Sky (from Thinking Out Loud)
Last Kiss (from Even So)

Charts

2006 greatest hits albums
Bonnie Pink albums
Warner Music Japan compilation albums